Topi Raja Sweety Roja is a 1996 Indian Telugu-language comedy film, produced by Dr. A. Vijayalakshmi under the Sri Sai Madhavi Productions banner and directed by Dr. N. Siva Prasad. It stars Rajendra Prasad, Roja  with music composed by Hero Rajendra Prasad.

Plot
The film begins in a village where Raja (Rajendra Prasad) a young & energetic guy lives along with his mother Janakamma (Annapurna). Everyone in the village credits him for his amiable nature. Roja (Roja) a cute & charming girl, daughter of Zamindar loves Raja. Being cognizant of it, Roja's maternal uncle Bobby (Babu Mohan), who aspires to marry becomes furious. So he ploys with a burglars gang headed by Kota (Kota Srinivasa Rao). On the occasion of a temple celebration, they heist the jewelry and indicts Raja when he absconds. Meanwhile, the robbers are witnessed by a child Baby (Baby Disha) who is reared by a Church Father (Suthi Velu). So, they try to slaughter her, fortunately, Raja rescues her when Father gives him shelter. Once a plight arises that Raja is about caught when Father protects him using an astonishing magical cap that makes a person invisible. After some time, observing Raja's honesty Father permits to use the cap with an oath to never misuse. The rest of the story is a comic tale that how Raja teases and comforts the robbers with the magical cap. Finally, Raja seizes the culprits and proves his innocence with the help of Roja.

Cast

Rajendra Prasad as Raja
Roja as Roja
Kota Srinivasa Rao as Kota
Brahmanandam as Brahmam
Babu Mohan as Bobby
Mallikarjuna Rao as Gunapam
A.V.S as Aadiseshu
Suthi Velu as Father
Rallapalli as Priest
Narra Venkateswara Rao as Constable
Padmanabham as Magician
Peketi Sivaram as Magician
Annapurna as Janakamma
Jayalalita as Aadiseshu's sister
Srilakshmi as Mandodari
Y. Vijaya as Roja's mother
Baby Disha as Baby

Crew
Art: Krishna Murthy
Choreography: Dileep, Suchitra, Swarna, Krishna Reddy
Fights: Tyagarajan
Dialogues: Rajendra Kumar
Lyrics: Vennelakanti, Sahithi, Vedavyas, N. Siva Prasad
Playback: S. P. Balasubrahmanyam, Mano, Chitra, Radhika, Swarnalatha
Music: Rajendra Prasad
Editing: Gowtham Raju
Cinematography: P. S. Prakash
Executive Producer: G. Venugopal
Producer: Dr. A. Vijaya Lakshmi
Story - Screenplay - Director: Dr. N. Siva Prasad
Banner: Sree Sai Madhavi Productions
Release Date: 1996

Soundtrack

Music composed by Rajendra Prasad. Music released on Supreme Music Company.

Other
 VCDs and DVDs on - VOLGA Videos, Hyderabad

References

1996 films
1990s Telugu-language films